Lake Hawdon may refer to the following:

Lake Hawdon (New Zealand), a lake in New Zealand
Lake Hawdon (South Australia), a lake in the south east of South Australia
Lake Hawdon System Important Bird Area, a designation in South Australia associated with Lake Hawdon and other nearby lakes
Lake Hawdon South Conservation Park, a protected area in South Australia associated with part of Lake Hawdon

See also
Joseph Hawdon